Kaunas our Lord Jesus Christ's Resurrection Basilica is a monumental Roman Catholic church in Kaunas, Lithuania. The church was consecrated in 2004, and in 2005 it was finally completed. It is the largest  basilical church in the Baltic States.

History

After Lithuania regained independence in 1918, the concept of a new church that would express gratitude to God for its regained freedom arose. A committee led by president Antanas Smetona was established in 1926 to oversee its construction. The City of Kaunas was chosen as its site, since the historic capital of Lithuania, Vilnius, was part of Poland between 1920 and 1939. A design competition was held in 1928 and the proposal drawn up by Karolis Reisonas was chosen for the church as the best. Due to the technical difficulties arising from the grand scope of the design, and dramatic escalation of its cost estimates, the final design was not approved until 1933.

The first cornerstone for the church was brought from Jerusalem's Mount Olive in 1934, marking the church's first symbolic milestone. Funds for the construction were raised in Lithuania and abroad. The prominent Lithuanian parson Feliksas Kapočius was particularly involved not only in the details of the building project, but also in its funding. He traveled through the United States, where many Lithuanian émigrés were living, to enlist support. The construction underwent several setbacks, and at times was suspended for lack of funding.
 
In 1936 certain Czechoslovak architects from Prague said that the church will become a masterpiece of modern architecture in the Baltics. In 1938 the walls and roof of the church were completed, and by 1940 it was largely finished; at this point around one million litas had been spent, most of it from individual donations. Further work on the church was suspended during World War II. The Nazi occupational authorities used the church as a storeroom; during the Soviet occupation of Lithuania, the building was confiscated by the government. In 1952 Stalin decreed that it be used as a factory; the cross atop the tower was demolished, as was the chapel.

The church structure was used as a radio factory until the Lithuanian national awakening in 1988. Soon thereafter, control of the church was returned to a newly founded council. During the 1990s, its rehabilitation met with further obstacles; church and state had been officially separated, and Lithuanian citizens struggled with economic downturns during the transition to a market economy. In any event, the work continued. Funding was provided by both private sources and the Lithuanian government, and the church was consecrated in 2004.

In 2015 the church received the minor basilica title from Pope Francis.

Resurrection Basilica today

The church now features two towers: one is 70 meters high, and a lower one arises from the main altar. In the main tower's upper level there is an additional chapel. An elevator permits access to the church's roof, which affords a panoramic view of the city. 

The church stands atop Kaunas's Green Hill, Žaliakalnis. Its cellarage houses a columbarium and a parish museum. The church is not solely dedicated to Roman Catholic ceremonies - it is also used for community gatherings and events, and as a preschool. The sanctuary seats 400; altogether, it can accommodate about 5,000 people.

Notes

References
B. Kviklys. Mūsų Lietuva. Vilnius, 1991. T-II 
The History of Christ’s Resurrection Church and Parish. Accessed October 14, 2006.

External links 

Roman Catholic churches completed in 2005
Roman Catholic churches in Kaunas
History of Kaunas
Roman Catholic churches in Lithuania
21st-century Roman Catholic church buildings